N-Arachidonoyl dopamine (NADA) is an endocannabinoid that acts as an agonist of the CB1 receptor and the transient receptor potential V1 (TRPV1) ion channel. NADA was first described as a putative endocannabinoid (agonist for the CB1 receptor) in 2000 and was subsequently identified as an endovanilloid (agonist for TRPV1) in 2002. NADA is an endogenous arachidonic acid based lipid found in the brain of rats, with especially high concentrations in the hippocampus, cerebellum, and striatum. It activates the TRPV1 channel with an EC50 of approximately of 50 nM which makes it the putative endogenous TRPV1 agonist.

In mice, NADA was shown to induce the tetrad of physiological paradigms associated with cannabinoids: hypothermia, hypo-locomotion, catalepsy, and analgesia. NADA has been found to play a regulatory role in both the peripheral and central nervous systems, and displays antioxidant and neuroprotectant properties. NADA has also been implicated in smooth muscle contraction and vasorelaxation in blood vessels. Additionally, NADA has been observed to suppress inflammatory activation of human Jurkat T cells and to inhibit the release of prostaglandin E2 (PGE2) from lipopolysaccharide (LPS)-activated astrocytes, microglia and mouse brain ECs (MEC-Brain). NADA also promotes the inflammatory resolution of human endothelial cells activated by both endogenous (i.e. TNF) and exogenous (i.e. bacterial derived LPS (TLR4 agonist) and FSL-1 (TLR2/6 agonist)) inflammatory mediators. It can increase the TRPV1-mediated release of substance P and calcitonin gene-related peptide (CGRP) in rat dorsal spinal cord slices. Furthermore, NADA also displays inhibitory activity in HIV-1 replication assays. Finally, NADA can prevent the degranulation and release of TNF from RBL- 2H3 mast cells treated with an IgE-antigen complex. Together, these studies show that physiological functions attributed to NADA are multifaceted, and include the ability to modulate the immune response.

The biosynthetic pathway of N-arachindonoyldopamine is not well understood. It has been proposed to be conjugated from arachidonoyl-CoA or arachidonoyl phospholipids and dopamine, but in vitro experiments do not support this theory. However, the indirect biosynthesis of phospholipid esters with dopamine may be possible, as dopamine can induce the aminolysis of the glycerol-fatty acid bonds in phospholipid chains (arachidonoyl, palmitoyl, linoleyl, etc.).

See also 
 Endocannabinoid

References

External links 
 General information about NADA.

Endocannabinoids
Vanilloids
Eicosanoids
Catechols
Fatty acid amides
CB1 receptor agonists
Arachidonyl compounds